Gerry Gravelle (15 December 1934 – 29 December 2022) was a Canadian ski jumper who competed in the 1960 Winter Olympics.

References

1934 births
2022 deaths
Canadian male ski jumpers
Olympic ski jumpers of Canada
Ski jumpers at the 1960 Winter Olympics